Ecastolol is a beta blocker.

References

Beta blockers
Isoxazoles
Anilides
Phenol ethers